Chryseobacterium indoltheticum  is a bacterium from the genus of Chryseobacterium which has been isolated from marine mud.

References

Further reading

External links
Type strain of Chryseobacterium indoltheticum at BacDive -  the Bacterial Diversity Metadatabase	

indoltheticum
Bacteria described in 1994